Dorothy Crowe Vest (May 10, 1919 in Brownsville, Texas – January 7, 2013  ) was a female tennis player from Jackson, Mississippi. She is the eponym of Jackson's Dorothy Vest Tennis Center.

Vest is known for establishing the sport of tennis in Mississippi. During her career she participated in competitions which led to grand slam tennis events and was undefeated in mixed doubles with her partner Slew Hester. In 1979 her family was selected for the United States Tennis Association's Ralph W. Westcott USTA Family of the Year Award, and in 1980 Dorothy Vest was inducted into the Mississippi Sports Hall of Fame. Her two daughters—Rebecca L. "Becky" Vest (inducted 1998) and Carol Ann Vest Dunn (inducted 2003)--are in the Mississippi Tennis Hall of Fame. From 1951 to 1981 Dorothy Vest was Director of Tennis for the City of Jackson, where she not only coached the game but also supervised the building of tennis facilities.

The Mississippi Tennis Association annually gives a Dorothy Vest Award for the best male tennis player and the best female tennis player in Mississippi. As of 2011 Vest lived in Dallas, Texas.

Notes

1919 births
2013 deaths
American female tennis players
American Presbyterians
Mississippi Republicans
People from Brownsville, Texas
Sportspeople from Jackson, Mississippi
Tennis people from Mississippi
Tennis players from Dallas
Texas Republicans
21st-century American women